Alexander Thamm (born 6 May 1983 in Hattingen) is a German retired footballer.

Career
He made his professional debut in the Bundesliga on March 22, 2003, when he started a game for VfL Bochum against VfL Wolfsburg. On 26 May 2009 announced his departure from the reserve of FC Schalke 04 and signed with Sportfreunde Lotte. After he played one year in Lotte and one year for Rot-Weiss Essen, he signed a contract with Rot Weiss Ahlen.

References

External links
 
 

German footballers
VfL Bochum players
VfL Bochum II players
Rot-Weiss Essen players
SC Preußen Münster players
1983 births
Living people
FC Schalke 04 II players
Sportfreunde Lotte players
Rot Weiss Ahlen players
Bundesliga players
SpVgg Erkenschwick players
Association football defenders
People from Hattingen
Sportspeople from Arnsberg (region)
Footballers from North Rhine-Westphalia